The 1979 NAIA Division I football season was the 24th season of college football sponsored by the NAIA, was the 10th season of play of the NAIA's top division for football.

The season was played from August to November 1979 and culminated in the 1979 NAIA Division I Football National Championship. Known again this year as the Palm Bowl, the title game was played on December 15, 1979, at McAllen Veterans Memorial Stadium in McAllen, Texas.

Texas A&I defeated Central State (OK) in the Palm Bowl, 20–14, to win their sixth NAIA national title.

Conference realignment

Membership changes

Conference standings

Conference champions

Postseason

See also
 1979 NAIA Division II football season
 1979 NCAA Division I-A football season
 1979 NCAA Division I-AA football season
 1979 NCAA Division II football season
 1979 NCAA Division III football season

References

 
NAIA Football National Championship